The 1966 Lamar Tech Cardinals football team represented Lamar State College of Technology—now known as Lamar University—as a member of the Southland Conference during the 1966 NCAA College Division football season. Led by fourth-year head coach Vernon Glass, the Cardinals compiled an overall record of 6–4 with a mark of 3–1 in conference play, sharing the Southland  title .sharing the conference championship with Arlington State. Lamar Tech played home games at Cardinal Stadium in Beaumont, Texas.

Schedule

References

Lamar Tech
Lamar Cardinals football seasons
Southland Conference football champion seasons
Lamar Tech Cardinals football